Belchalwell Street is a village in Dorset, England, at the foot of Bell Hill, generally included in the village of Belchalwell.

External links
Belchalwell

Villages in Dorset